Margrete: Queen of the North is a 2021 Danish historical drama film, directed and co-written by Charlotte Sieling. The film is a fictionalised account of the 'False Oluf', an impostor who in 1402 claimed to be the deceased King Olaf II/Olav IV of Denmark-Norway, son of the title character Margrete I of Denmark.

It was one of the largest productions in the history of Danish cinema, enjoying the largest budget ever for a Danish-language feature film. It premiered on 16 September 2021.

Plot 
The film begins with the young Princess Margrete of Denmark witnessing the horrific bloodshed following the victory of her father, King Valdemar IV Atterdag, at the 1361 Battle of Visby.

Forty years later, and Margrete, now queen, has successfully united Denmark, Norway and Sweden under her rule, thereby founding the Kalmar Union and bringing a decade of peace to a region hitherto wracked by constant warfare. However, she does not exercise power in her own right but on behalf of her adopted son Erik, whom she has had crowned king in each of the three kingdoms, and even though he is now of age she continues to rule in his name, aided by her friend and advisor Peder Jensen Lodehat, the Bishop of Roskilde.

In 1402, Margrete summons the leading magnates of the three kingdoms to Kalmar Castle to witness Erik's betrothal to Philippa of England, the daughter of King Henry IV of England. Philippa is accompanied by an English lord, William Bourcier, who has been tasked with negotiating the financial and political terms of the marriage agreement. Margrete is especially keen to establish a strong military alliance with England in order to deter attacks by the Union's German enemies, in particular the Teutonic Order, which rules Prussia and has also recently seized the Swedish island of Gotland.

During the feast to welcome the English party to Kalmar, the Norwegian magnate Asle Jonsson tells Margrete that en route to Kalmar he met a man who had come from Graudenz (in Prussia) and claims to be Oluf, Margrete's son. Oluf had as a child been king of both Denmark and Norway, but had died suddenly at Falsterbo fifteen years previously (i.e. in 1387). At the time he had been seventeen years old, just about to come of age and take over rule of the two kingdoms from his mother, and ever since the queen's enemies have spread dark rumours that she had him murdered in order to retain power herself. Margrete assures Asle that her son is dead, but he insists that he recognises the man as Oluf. This incendiary news quickly spreads, and so Margrete orders Asle to bring the man to Kalmar so that the matter can be put to rest. Meanwhile, Margrete grows suspicious of Raberlin, a German merchant present at the feast, and orders her Swedish retainer Jakob Nilsson to follow him when he returns to Prussia.

The Man from Graudenz is brought to Kalmar and publicly interrogated by Margrete. He repeats his claim that he is King Oluf, and explains that in 1387 one of his retainers was ordered to kill him by persons unknown. The assassin could not bring himself to go through with the deed, and so instead kidnapped him and took him to Prussia, where he has been held captive by the Teutonic Order for the last fifteen years. A few weeks ago, he was suddenly released without explanation, and he has subsequently made his way back to Scandinavia to reclaim his rightful inheritance. The Danish & Swedish councillors are sceptical of this story, but their Norwegian counterparts are more willing to believe it (as Oluf's father was the previous Norwegian king, Håkon VI), and several of them, like Asle, claim to recognise the Man from Graudenz as Oluf. Margrete orders him to be confined to the dungeons while she decides what to do with him.

Over the following days, Margrete finds herself faced with a horrible dilemma. Erik - who would lose his legitimacy if the prisoner is recognised as Oluf - becomes increasingly agitated and unstable, while Bishop Peder urges her to have the Man from Graudenz executed immediately in order to prevent discord between the three realms, and Bourcier threatens to break off negotiations and return to England with Philippa unless the question of Erik's status is resolved quickly. On the other hand, Asle Jonsson and the Norwegian councillors are adamant that the Man from Graudenz is Oluf, and the more Margrete speaks to him, the more she starts to wonder if he really is her son. A further element of doubt is introduced when she discovers that none of her councillors saw Oluf's corpse after his supposed death, as they were all too afraid of infection from the plague to open his coffin.

In an effort to make the decision easier for herself, Margrete proposes that if the Man from Graudenz publicly denies that he is Oluf, then she will spare his life. However, he stubbornly refuses to do so, and moreover Bishop Peder points out that even if the pretender were to renounce his claims, he will still be a threat to Erik, and to Scandinavian unity, as long as he remains alive.

Margrete eventually has a flash of inspiration and realises that the Man from Graudenz's story about an attempt on his life might be the root of the rumours that she had her son killed. She never gave any such order, and there is only one other person who would have had the authority to do so in her stead. She confronts Peder, who admits that he ordered Oluf's retainer to murder him and explains that he acted for the greater good, as Oluf would never have been an acceptable ruler for the Swedes in the way Margrete has been. It was therefore necessary to get rid of Oluf so that Margrete could retain power in Denmark-Norway and then take control of Sweden as well, thereby completing the Kalmar Union and finally bringing peace to Scandinavia.

Margrete is now convinced that the Man from Graudenz is indeed her son Oluf, but before she can act on this, Erik produces a witness to falsely confess to teaching the Man from Graudenz how to impersonate Oluf. Having thus 'proved' that Oluf is an impostor, Erik sentences him to death for treason. Margrete and the Norwegian magnates protest, but the Danish and Swedish magnates back Erik, as do the bishops, led by Peder.

That evening Margrete has Asle spring Oluf from his prison cell, intending that the three of them will escape together to Bergen, though she realises that this will probably lead to war between Norway and Denmark-Sweden. However, just as Margrete is about to slip out of the castle to rendezvous with Oluf and Asle, Jakob Nilsson arrives to see her, newly returned from his escapade in Prussia. He has learnt that the Teutonic Order is planning an invasion of mainland Sweden, and that the Order deliberately timed the release of Oluf in order to cause maximum discord amongst the Scandinavian kingdoms (and to wreck the mooted alliance with England), and thereby leave the Kalmar Union vulnerable. Realising that Scandinavian unity is more important in the face of the Teutonic threat than her personal feelings, Margrete betrays Oluf, who is quickly recaptured by Erik's men. Margrete manages to persuade Erik to spare Asle, but Oluf is publicly burned alive as a traitor in front of his mother. It is implied that, with Scandinavian unity restored, the Teutonic Order calls off its planned invasion.

The film ends with a brief text stating that the Kalmar Union lasted for a further century after Margrete's death, and claiming that the close affinity that exists to this day between the three Scandinavian nations is in large part thanks to her.

Cast 
 Trine Dyrholm as Queen Margrete
 Søren Malling as Peder Jensen Lodehat
 Jakob Oftebro as Man from Graudenz
  as King Erik
  as 
 Magnus Krepper as Johan Sparre
 Bjørn Floberg as Asle Jonsson
 Paul Blackthorne as Sir William Bourcier
 Agnes Westerlund Rase as Astrid
 Simon J. Berger as Jakob Nilsson
  as Roar
 Richard Sammel as Raberlin
 Annika Hallin as Malin
 Halldóra Geirharðsdóttir as Hildur
 Diana Martinová as Princess Philippa of England

Production 
The film had a budget of about 73 million Danish kroner. The Danish Film Institute gave 20 million DKK to the production, which is the largest single grant in production aid it has ever made.

Production was badly hit by the coronavirus pandemic, as the film crew had only managed to complete 10 days of filming in Prague before having to stop on 12 March 2020 due to the virus outbreak. In order to save the production, the producers sought an extra 8.5 million DKK from Film i Väst, the Queen Margrethe & Prince Henrik Foundation, the A.P. Møller Fund, the Carlsberg Foundation and the Augustinus Fund.

Release 
The film premiered in Denmark on 16 September 2021. It had a limited theatrical release in North America and was released on VOD by Samuel Goldwyn Films on 17 December 2021.

Reception

Box office 
Margrete: Queen of the North grossed $0 in North America and a worldwide total of $45,878, against a production budget of about $9.8 million.

Critical response
On review aggregator Rotten Tomatoes, the film holds an approval rating of 93% based on 14 reviews, with an average rating of 7.2/10. On Metacritic, the film holds a score of 68 out of 100, based on 5 critics, indicating "generally favorable reviews". The magazine Ekko gave the film five stars out of six and called it an "impressive achievement in Danish film history." Berlingske Tidende gave Margrete: Queen of the North six out of six stars and wrote that the film was "the best film about Danish history in decades" and that it had a "superb cast of actors". Dagbladet Information described the story as "thorough, credible and focused", and the film as a whole as "visually and evocatively executed". Jyllands-Posten gave Margrete: Queen of the North five stars out of six and praised Trine Dyrholm's performance.

References

External links 
 
 
 MARGRETE DEN FØRSTE at Danske Filminstitut 
 Margrete den første at danskefilm.dk 
 Drottning Margareta at Svensk Filmdatabas 
 Margrete - Queen of the North at Icelandic Film Centre
 MARGRETE — QUEEN OF THE NORTH at Allociné 

2021 films
Danish drama films
Danish multilingual films
2020s Danish-language films
2020s Swedish-language films
2020s Norwegian-language films
Danish historical drama films
2020s historical drama films
Films set in the Middle Ages
Films set in the 1400s
Filicide in fiction
Films postponed due to the COVID-19 pandemic
Films scored by Jon Ekstrand
Films shot in the Czech Republic
2021 multilingual films
Margaret I of Denmark